Bhima is a genus of moths in the family Lasiocampidae. The genus was first described by Frederic Moore in 1888.

Species 
Bhima borneana Holloway, 1987
Bhima eximia Oberthür, 1881
Bhima idiota Graeser, 1888
Bhima potanini Alphéraky, 1895
Bhima rotundipennis de Joannis, 1930
Bhima undulosa Walker, 1855

External links

Lasiocampidae